Those marked in bold have now been capped at full International level.

Group 1

England 

Head coach:  David Platt

Italy 

Head coach:  Claudio Gentile
''Caps and age as of 17 May 2002, before the start of the tournament

Portugal 

Head coach: Agostinho Oliveira

Switzerland 

Head coach: Bernard Challandes

Group 2

Belgium 

Head coach: Jean-François de Sart

Czech Republic

Head coach:  Miroslav Beránek

France

Head coach: Raymond Domenech

Greece 

Head coach: Andreas Michalopoulos

Footnotes

Squads
UEFA European Under-21 Championship squads